Jim Loves Jack is a Canadian documentary film, released in 1996. Directed by David Adkin, the film is a documentary about Jim Egan and John Norris "Jack" Nesbit, a same-sex couple who were at the centre of the landmark Supreme Court of Canada case Egan v. Canada, which established sexual orientation as a prohibited basis of discrimination under the Canadian Charter of Rights and Freedoms. Egan also had a longer history as an activist, having been Canada's first prominent LGBT rights activist in the 1950s and 1960s before retreating into a quieter domestic life with the more publicity-averse Nesbit.

The film had its theatrical premiere in Toronto on January 19, 1996. It was screened at various documentary and LGBT film festivals, and had television broadcasts on VisionTV and Knowledge Network.

Notes

External links

1996 films
1996 documentary films
Canadian LGBT-related films
English-language Canadian films
Canadian independent films
Documentary films about gay men
1996 independent films
1996 LGBT-related films
1990s English-language films
1990s Canadian films